County Cavan was a constituency representing County Cavan in the Irish House of Commons, the lower house in the Irish Parliament of the Kingdom of Ireland from 1611 to 1800.

Between 1725 and 1793 Catholics and those married to Catholics could not vote.

History
In the Patriot Parliament of 1689 summoned by King James II, Cavan County was represented with two members.

Members of Parliament

Notes

Elections

References

Bibliography

Constituencies of the Parliament of Ireland (pre-1801)
Historic constituencies in County Cavan
1611 establishments in Ireland
1800 disestablishments in Ireland
Constituencies established in 1611
Constituencies disestablished in 1800